Hacknet is a 2015 video game that allows the player to perform simulated computer hacking.

Gameplay 
The game simulates a Unix-like operating system, with every main element of the game's interface having its own window. Windows are tiled in a fashion highly reminiscent of the i3 window manager. The windows have multiple tiling configurations with their own wallpapers and color schemes, which can be found as files as the game progresses. The main gameplay is done through two large interfaces, a graphical display, and a Unix terminal. Both interfaces are essential for gameplay, though the player can use either as their "main" interface. Along with the terminal, the computers in the game simulate a Unix-like file system, through which the player can explore the computer, and even destroy them by deleting critical system files. The core of the gameplay is to connect to other computers and run dedicated programs to break the security and acquire superuser privileges on the computer. The general procedure is to first run a scan to see what protections the computer has and then run programs matching what the scan revealed. Each program takes up a certain amount of memory, which the player has to manage, as there is only a limited amount of memory to share.

The game notably averts the common trope of bouncing a connection between several intermediary computers before reaching the target computer. Instead, a simplified system of a variable speed countdown is used to force the player to act quickly. If this countdown reaches zero, the player is given one last chance to avoid a game over by hacking their ISP and changing their IP address.

Once superuser privileges have been obtained, the file system of the computer is investigated. The exact task on each computer varies for each mission, but can, in general, be performed by running a specific command to access one or more files on the system.

A few systems have specialized interfaces, such as email systems and databases.

Most computer systems contain text files that can be read. A large majority of the files are quotes from the website bash.org.

Story 
The game begins with the player being automatically contacted by a user by the username "Bit". The automated message tells the player that it was sent in the event of Bit's death and asks that the player investigate his death.

Bit then starts to teach you the game mechanics by way of simple missions. Bit will then tell you to join the hacking group Entropy.

After the tutorial, the story largely takes a back seat for open-ended gameplay, with a mission to address Bit's fate. This mission suggests that Bit was involved in some sort of illegal activity.

Naix 
One of the missions the player takes on involves an opposing hacker by the alias of "Naix". They take offense to being investigated and attack the player by hacking their system. This attack can be defended against by launching the shell program on the user's computer and using the trap feature to stop the connection. However, this is not explained to users in-game. If the attack is successful, it will result in the game GUI disappearing and the virtual computer rebooting, leaving the player with a minimal console interface. Once the player has recovered their system from the attack, the storyline of the game splits: the player can choose to take revenge on the attacker and as a reward get access to a third faction in the game, or follow the guidance of their mission control and make a statement that such behavior is not acceptable, resulting in the resumption of your missions with the faction you were in (called Entropy) before the attack.

Project Junebug 
One late-game mission in the game is called "Project Junebug". While the player can see it right after joining the hacking group that offers it, the mission will remain locked until all other missions have been taken care of. The mission is a request to provide euthanasia for someone terminally ill by hacking their pacemaker.

Finale 
As the final story arc of the game, the player breaks into the computers of a computer security software company named "EnTech". As they do so, they are faced with a security system that makes computers invulnerable to the tools currently at the disposal of the player. As the player manages to find alternative ways into the protected systems, they discover that Bit was involved in a project for the company; specifically, the creation of a highly advanced operating system specialized in computer hacking. It is revealed that the plan for the project is to unleash the new operating system to the world in order to cause consumer demand for the protection system.

Bit in particular was a major contributor. As the project was nearing its completion, Bit was starting to question the morality of the project. A project owner asked an anonymous figure to "discourage him." Due to miscommunication, this led to a hit being put on Bit that ended with Bit's assassination, despite the project owner's attempts to stop the murder.

Once all the facts of the story have been revealed to the player, they proceed to eradicate all copies of the Hacknet project. Additionally, by command of Bit himself, they bring down the server at the heart of Porthack, the tool that Bit made. Once this final mission is completed, Bit delivers a few final, voice acted words before the game credits roll.

Development
Hacknet was developed by Matt Trobbiani, the sole developer of Team Fractal Alligator, based in Australia.

Reception

Hacknet received generally positive reviews from critics.

GameSpot gave the game an 8/10, praising the game for its unique presentation puzzle design.

DLC
A DLC expansion for "Hacknet", titled "Hacknet Labyrinths" was announced on August 30, 2016. The expansion was set to come out December 2016; however, development issues delayed release to March 31, 2017.

The expansion features new hacking tools and security systems, as well as a 3- to 4-hour chapter to the game, where the player is recruited by a hacker that goes by the alias "Kaguya" into a small elite hacking team. It includes more secrets, more UI themes and a full new soundtrack, from artists such as synthwave artist OGRE and Rémi Gallego, creator of metal/electronic act "The Algorithm".

Extensions
In May 2017, official mod support for Hacknet titled Hacknet Extensions was released worldwide, in which players can create their own custom stories and campaigns for the game. These extensions can be shared and downloaded from the Steam Workshop. Extensions are separate from the main game, and are accessed from a separate menu from the title screen.

Hacknet Extensions also features extension-exclusive tools and the ability to implement custom music and themes.

Notes

References

External links 
 

2015 video games
Linux games
MacOS games
Simulation video games
Single-player video games
Video games developed in Australia
Video games scored by Christopher Larkin (composer)
Windows games
Hacking video games
Fellow Traveller games